E Company, 2nd Battalion of the 506th Parachute Infantry Regiment of the 101st Airborne Division, the "Screaming Eagles", is a company in the United States Army. The company was referred to as "Easy" after the radio call for "E" in the phonetic alphabet used during World War II. The experiences of its members during that war are the subject of the 1992 book Band of Brothers by historian Stephen Ambrose and the 2001 HBO miniseries of the same name.

History
The 506th PIR was an experimental airborne regiment created in 1942 to jump from C-47 transport airplanes into hostile territory.

E Company was established at Camp Toccoa, Georgia, under the command of 1st Lieutenant Herbert Sobel. Before attending paratrooper training, the unit's troops performed the standard battle drills and physical training that comes with being in the parachute infantry. One of the exercises was running Currahee, a large, steep hill whose trail ran "three miles up, three miles down". The troops also performed formation runs in three four-column running groups, an innovation that was adopted by the Army in the 1960s.

Sobel, who was known for his extreme strictness, got the troops in such impeccable physical condition that they were able to skip the physical training portion of Jump School.

Composition
One of its commanders, Major Richard Winters, said E Company originally "included three rifle platoons and a headquarters section. Each platoon contained three twelve-man rifle squads and a six-man mortar team squad. Easy also had one machine gun attached to each of its rifle squads, and a 60mm mortar in each mortar team."

World War II

Mutiny protesting Sobel's leadership
While waiting for the invasion of Normandy, Easy Company was located at Aldbourne, Wiltshire, England.

The tension that had been brewing between Winters and Sobel came to a head. For some time, Winters had privately held concerns over Sobel's ability to lead the company in combat. Many of the enlisted men in the company had come to respect Winters for his competence and had also developed their own concerns about Sobel's leadership. Winters later said that he never wanted to compete with Sobel for command of Easy Company; still, Sobel attempted to bring Winters up on trumped-up charges for "failure to carry out a lawful order". Feeling that his punishment was unjust, Winters requested that the charge be reviewed by court-martial. One day after Winters' punishment was set aside by battalion commander Major Robert L. Strayer, Sobel brought Winters up on another charge. During the investigation, Winters was transferred to the Headquarters Company and appointed as the battalion mess officer.

A number of the company's non-commissioned officers (NCOs) decided to give the regimental commander, Colonel Robert Sink, an ultimatum: replace Sobel, or they would surrender their stripes. Sink was not impressed. He demoted to private the two platoon sergeants who were considered to be the ringleaders of the NCOs, Terrence 'Salty' Harris and Myron Ranney, and transferred them to A Company and I Company respectively. 

Still, Sink realized that something had to be done and decided to transfer Sobel out of Easy Company, giving him command of a new parachute training school at Chilton Foliat. Winters' court-martial was set aside and he returned to Easy Company as a lieutenant of 1st Platoon. Winters later said he felt that despite his differences with Sobel, at least part of Easy Company's success had been due to Sobel's strenuous training and high expectations.

In February 1944, First Lieutenant Thomas Meehan was given command of Easy Company.

Shortly after their transfer, Harris and Ranney joined the Pathfinders, which consisted of around 80 volunteers from every unit who would land first and guide the way for the main waves of the invasion. Being a Pathfinder was a difficult job, and it meant being out in front and facing the German army alone. Shortly before the invasion, Ranney wrote to Winters, pleading his case, and five days before the invasion, orders came in transferring Ranney back to Easy Company.

Operation Overlord
For Operation Overlord, E Company's mission was to capture the entrances to and clear any obstacles around "Causeway 2", a pre-selected route off Utah Beach for the Allied forces landing from the sea a few hours later.

The company departed from Upottery airbase in Devon, England, and dropped over the Cotentin Peninsula of Normandy, France, in the early hours of the morning of 6 June 1944. Easy Company flew in eight aircraft in Sticks #66-73, with about 17 paratroopers per stick.

Destruction of Stick 66
Most of Easy Company's headquarters section was assigned to Stick #66, with Robert Burr Smith and Joseph "Red" Hogan assigned to other planes to save weight. The 17 members of Stick #66 included company commander Meehan and three of its most senior non-commissioned officers: First Sergeant Bill Evans, Staff Sergeant Murray Roberts (the Supply Sergeant) and Sergeant Elmer Murray (the Operations Sergeant). Sergeant Carwood Lipton recalled later that he had strategized various combat situations with Sergeant Murray while the rest of Easy Company went to the movies the day before the jump.

Plane #66 led a diamond formation that also included #67 to the left, #68 to the right, and #69 in trailing position. Over France, the plane carrying Stick #66 was hit by anti-aircraft fire. The pilot did a 180-degree turn and turned the landing lights on as the plane lost altitude, but it hit a hedgerow and exploded, killing all aboard. The crash was witnessed by Ed Mauser of E Company's 2nd Platoon, who had leapt from plane #69 after it was hit by flak and the pilot turned on the green jump light. Mauser's neck was snapped back by his plane's prop blast and he faced backwards as he floated downwards, giving him a view of plane #66.

Brecourt Manor Assault
With Meehan missing (it was only discovered later that he had been killed), Richard Winters was the most senior officer in Easy Company and took command. After assembling on the ground, the men of E Company disabled a battery of four German heavy guns on D-Day that threatened forces coming along Causeway 2.

Leadership changes
The loss of so many officers and NCOs on D-Day brought a few changes to Easy Company. Technically, Lieutenant Raymond Schmitz, 2nd Platoon Leader, was still with Easy Company, but got injured the day before D-Day after demanding Richard Winters wrestle him, and was replaced by Buck Compton.

Carentan
The capture of Carentan would allow the Americans to link Omaha and Utah beaches, providing access for armor and equipment. The Germans were aware of its strategic importance and had established defenses. Donald Malarkey wrote later that Lieutenant Winters made him mortar sergeant of second platoon. E Company, along with Dog and Fox companies, were walking down the road to Carentan when they came to an intersection and one or two German machine gun teams began firing on them. Mortars and tanks soon joined the fight. The American soldiers all jumped into ditches for cover. Winters saw this and as Malarkey wrote, Winters "got hotter than I've ever seen him." It was a fast attack, at the end of which Malarkey said that he could hear moans and groans of wounded soldiers and occasional gun shots. Also at the end of the battle Winters was slightly wounded in his lower right leg by a ricocheting bullet fragment. The Germans mounted a counterattack, but 2nd Battalion held onto Carentan.

Casualties
By the time the company was pulled off the line, 22 of its men had been killed in action, mostly in Stick 66, and another 43 had been wounded, for a 47% casualty rate. Winters' roster records that of the 139 men of Easy Company who left England on the night of 5 June, just 69 enlisted men and five officers were left: Winters; his three platoon leaders Buck Compton, Harry Welsh, and Warren Rousch; and Rousch's assistant Francis L.O’Brien.

Eindhoven, the Netherlands
As part of the ultimately unsuccessful Operation Market Garden, E Company was assigned to support the British forces around Eindhoven by defending the roads and bridges that would allow British armored divisions to advance into Arnhem and force a crossing over the major bridge across the Rhine in September 1944.

E Company landed on its designated drop zone in the Sonsche Forest, northwest of Son, and marched down the road into Son behind the 2nd Battalion's other two companies. On reaching the Son Bridge, they were met by enemy harassing fire while the bridge was destroyed by the Germans. After the Regiment's engineers constructed a makeshift crossing, E and the rest of the 506th moved out for Eindhoven. These events were omitted from the Band of Brothers series, with E having been portrayed as landing in the Netherlands and then marching into Eindhoven to join up with the British Army advancing from the south.

On 19 September, the company departed for Helmond, accompanied by six Cromwell tanks of the British 11th Armoured Division. Their advance was halted by the German 107th Panzer Brigade outside Nuenen and they were forced to retreat to Tongelre. During the days following the link-up, E Company  defended the towns of Veghel and Uden until XXX Corps infantry took up the task. As Market Garden progressed, the company and the rest of the 101st joined the 82nd Airborne on "the island" north of Nijmegen.

At the conclusion of Market Garden, the company relieved the British 43rd (Wessex) Infantry Division in Zetten. On 5 October 1944, 1st Platoon fought in the battle of "the island" that lay between the Lower Rhine and the Waal river. Along with a platoon from Fox Company and support from the Royal Artillery, they routed two Waffen-SS companies on 5 October 1944. Colonel Sink issued a general order citing the company's 1st Platoon for gallantry in action, calling their attack a "daring act and skillful maneuver against a numerically superior force".

In October, E Company helped rescue more than 100 British troops trapped since September's Battle of Arnhem in German-occupied territory by the Lower Rhine near the village of Renkum. Dubbed Operation Pegasus, the effort took place during the night of 22–23 October 1944. On the south bank of a Dutch river, Canadian engineers and a patrol of E Company observed the signal and launched their boats, but the British were some 500 to 800 meters upriver of the crossing point. Upon reaching the north bank, E Company established a small perimeter while its soldiers headed east to locate the British troops. The men quickly moved downstream and in the next 90 minutes all of them were evacuated, except for one Russian who was captured by the Germans. The Germans opened fire sporadically and some mortar rounds fell near the crossing, but the fire was inaccurate. The men were later flown back to the UK, rejoining the men who had escaped in Operation Berlin. 

Nine members of E Company were killed in action in Holland with at least 40 wounded.

Battle of the Bulge

During December 1944 and January 1945, E Company and the rest of the 101st Airborne Division fought in Belgium in the Battle of the Bulge. The 101st was in France in December when the Germans launched their offensive in the Ardennes. They were told to hold the vital cross-roads at Bastogne and were soon encircled by the Germans. E Company fought in frigid weather under German artillery fire without winter clothing and with limited rations and ammunition.

Between the days of 1 to 13 January, the company took control of the Bois Jacques woods in Belgium, between the town of Foy and Bizory. E Company was assigned to capture the town of Foy.

Division Headquarters ordered the attack to begin at 0900 hours. During the assault, newly appointed company commander Lieutenant Norman Dike led E Company forward, then ordered 1st platoon (led by Lieutenant Jack Foley) to the left and lost contact with them. Dike ordered the remainder of the company to take cover after coming under fire. With the unit unable to proceed, he was informed by his subordinates that they would get killed if they didn't advance into the town, as they were now unprotected from enemy fire. At the same time, Captain Richard Winters, former company commander and now acting battalion commanding officer, radioed to Dike, telling him the same thing. Dike ordered 1st platoon on a flanking mission around the town, and then found cover and froze, ignoring Winters' orders. As Carwood Lipton, the first sergeant at the time, later put it: "He fell apart."

According to Clancy Lyall, Dike stopped because he had been wounded in the right shoulder (which Lyall saw), not because he had panicked.

In either case, Dike was immediately relieved by First Lieutenant Ronald Speirs under orders from Captain Winters. To countermand Dike's previous orders, Speirs himself ran through the town and German lines (as 1st platoon had no radio), linked up with the Item Company soldiers and relayed the order. Having completed this, he then ran back through the German-occupied town. Carwood Lipton later stated that "the Germans were so shocked at seeing an American soldier running through their lines - they forgot to shoot!" Speirs was reassigned as commanding officer of E Company and remained in that position for the rest of the war.

With the capture of Foy, the Allies defeated the German line in Bastogne. Afterward, E Company and the rest of the 506th PIR moved into Germany. The 101st Airborne Division was awarded a unit citation for holding the line at Bastogne. E Company suffered 82 casualties including 15 killed in action.

Occupation duties
Toward the end of the war, E Company was assigned to occupation duty in Berchtesgaden, Germany, home to Adolf Hitler's Eagle's Nest house. After that, the company was sent to Austria for further occupation duty. The company mostly attended to various patrols, awaiting the end of the war.

Postwar
E Company and the rest of the 506th PIR were disbanded in November 1945. It was reactivated in 1954 as a training unit. Under the Combat Arms Regimental System and U.S. Army Regimental System, Easy Company's lineage and history is carried on as Alpha "Easy" Company, 2-506 Infantry, in Third Brigade Combat Team, "Rakkasan" in the 101st Airborne Division.

Notable personnel

140 men formed the original E Company in Camp Toccoa, Georgia. 366 men are listed as having belonged to the company by the war's end, due to transfers and replacements. 49 men of E Company were killed in action.

Company commanders

 Captain Herbert Maxwell Sobel (26 January 1912 – 30 September 1987)
 First Lieutenant Thomas Meehan III (8 July 1921 – 6 June 1944)
 Major Richard Davis Winters (21 January 1918 – 2 January 2011)
 First Lieutenant Frederick Theodore "Moose" Heyliger (23 June 1916 – 3 November 2001)
 First Lieutenant Norman Staunton "Foxhole Norman" Dike Jr. (19 May 1918 – 23 June 1989)
 Captain Ronald Charles Speirs (20 April 1920 – 11 April 2007)

Junior officers
 Captain Lewis Nixon (30 September 1918 – 11 January 1995)
 First Lieutenant Lynn Davis "Buck" Compton (31 December 1921 – 25 February 2012)
 First Lieutenant Edward David "Ed" Shames (13 June 1922 – 3 December 2021)
 Second Lieutenant Robert Burnham "Bob" Brewer (1924 – 5 December 1996)
 Second Lieutenant Clifford Carwood "Lip" Lipton (30 January 1920 – 16 December 2001)

Non-commissioned officers

In order of rank, then alphabetically by last name.
 Technical Sergeant Donald George "Don" Malarkey (30 July 1921 – 30 September 2017)
 Staff Sergeant William J. "Wild Bill" Guarnere Sr. (28 April 1923 – 8 March 2014) (served as a platoon leader as Staff Sergeant, before demotion)
 Staff Sergeant Darrell Cecil "Shifty" Powers (13 March 1923 – 17 June 2009)
 Sergeant Robert Emory "Popeye" Wynn Jr. (10 July 1921 – 18 March 2000)
 Corporal Walter Scott "Smokey" Gordon Jr. (15 April 1920 – 19 April 1997)

Enlisted men
 Sergeant James H “Moe” Alley (20 July 1922 - 14 March 2008) 
 Private First Class Edward James "Babe" Heffron (16 May 1923 – 1 December 2013)
 Private First Class Edward Joseph "Tip" Tipper (3 August 1921 – 1 February 2017)
 Private First Class David Kenyon Webster (2 June 1922 – 9 September 1961)
 Private Albert Blithe (25 June 1923 – 17 December 1967)
 Private First Class Bradford C. Freeman (4 September 1924 – 3 July 2022). He was the last remaining member of the unit.

See also
 Brécourt Manor Assault
 We Who Are Alive and Remain: Untold Stories From the Band of Brothers

References

Bibliography

External links 

 
 

101st Airborne Division
Companies of the United States Army
Military units and formations established in 1942